Inchs or Inches is a hamlet in the parish of Withiel, Cornwall, England.

References

Hamlets in Cornwall